Connarus agamae is a tree in the family Connaraceae. It is named for José Agama, a former Deputy Conservator of Forests in British North Borneo.

Description

Distribution and habitat
Connarus agamae is endemic to Sabah in Malaysian Borneo. Its habitat is mixed dipterocarp forest from sea-level to  altitude.

References

Connaraceae
Endemic flora of Borneo
Trees of Borneo
Flora of Sabah
Plants described in 1918
Flora of the Borneo lowland rain forests